The Free Buryatia Foundation is an advocacy group focused on the Russian federal subject of Buryatia. The foundation is located in Alexandria, Virginia, United States.

History 
The Foundation was founded in March 2022 in response to the 2022 Russian invasion of Ukraine, by opponents of the war in Buryatia and members of the global Buryats diaspora. Co-founder and journalist Alexandra Garmazhapova stated that the Russian government was "using impoverished Buryats as cannon fodder" and that "the future of Buryatia should be determined by the people of Buryatia in free elections."

The organization has organized legal aid for soldiers and national guard members who are conscientious objectors to the invasion of Ukraine, as well as for their families. According to the Foundation, it has helped at least 350 individuals as of early-July 2022, along with widely disseminating step-by-step guides on conscientious objection via social media. It has also used open-source intelligence to publish estimations of the number of Buryats killed in action in Ukraine, estimating that around 2.8% of Russian deaths as of late-April 2022 were Buryat, one of the highest death tolls among the Russian federal republics.

The Foundation criticizes the mobilisation.

Objectives 
The Foundation supports greater autonomy for Buryatia, including greater control over monetary and natural resources. It supports the promotion of the Buryat language and of the culture of the Buryats.

References 

Conscientious objection organizations
Non-profit organizations based in Virginia
2022 Russian invasion of Ukraine
Peace organizations
Indigenous rights organizations

sah:"Көҥүл Бүрээтийэ" фондата